Trio Töykeät (founded in 1988) was a Finnish jazz trio. Their music ranges from humorous ragtimes to sentimental waltzes. Their playing style is often rhythmic, energetic and virtuosic. The group disbanded in 2008.

Members
Iiro Rantala – piano
Rami Eskelinen – drums
Eerik Siikasaari – double bass

Releases
Päivää (1990)
G'day (1993) (international re-release of Päivää)
Jazzlantis (1995)
Rappiolla (1997)
Sisu (1997)
Kudos (2000)
Music! (2002)
High Standards (2003)
Wake (2005)
One Night in Tampere (2007)

External links
 Homepage of Trio Töykeät

Finnish jazz ensembles
Musical groups disestablished in 2008